Zafardyon Musabayev  is an Uzbekistan football forward who played for Uzbekistan in the 1996 Asian Cup. He also played for Navbahor Namangan.

Career
Musabayev began his career at Sokhibkor Khalkabad in the regionalized fourth-tier Soviet Second League B. In 1994, he joined Uzbekistan Super League side Navbahor Namangan. He finished his career at rivals FC Andijon.

Musabayev scored one goal in two appearances for Uzbekistan during the 1996 AFC Asian Cup qualifiers.

References

External links
Profile at Footballfacts.ru

Uzbekistani footballers
Living people
1975 births
People from Namangan Region
Soviet footballers
Uzbekistan international footballers
Navbahor Namangan players
Association football forwards